Johannes van den Bergh (born 21 November 1986) is a German professional footballer who plays as a left back.

Career
Van den Bergh was born in Germany, and is of distant Dutch descent. He started his professional career with Borussia Mönchengladbach, making his first appearance on 16 September  2006 in the Bundesliga. He was substituted on in the 46th minute in a 2–4 defeat to Aachen. On 23 June 2009, Van den Bergh left Borussia Mönchengladbach and signed a three-year contract with Fortuna Düsseldorf. On 24 May 2013, Van den Bergh left Fortuna Düsseldorf and signed a three-year contract with Hertha BSC. In June 2016 he joined Spanish side Getafe. 

On 30 January 2017, Van den Bergh returned to Germany on a six-month loan deal with Greuther Fürth. In August 2017, he moved to Holstein Kiel. On 17 December 2022, van den Bergh and Holstein Kiel agreed to terminate his contract on 31 December 2022.

Career statistics

References

External links
 
 

1986 births
Living people
People from Viersen
Sportspeople from Düsseldorf (region)
German footballers
German people of Dutch descent
Association football midfielders
Bundesliga players
2. Bundesliga players
Borussia Mönchengladbach II players
Borussia Mönchengladbach players
Bayer 04 Leverkusen players
Fortuna Düsseldorf players
Hertha BSC players
SpVgg Greuther Fürth players
Holstein Kiel players
Segunda División players
Getafe CF footballers
German expatriate footballers
German expatriate sportspeople in Spain
Expatriate footballers in Spain
Footballers from North Rhine-Westphalia